Lamellibrachia satsuma (also known as Satsuma tubeworm  or Satsumahaorimushi or ) is a vestimentiferan tube worm that was discovered near a hydrothermal vent in Kagoshima Bay, Kagoshima at the depth of only  the shallowest depth record for a vestimentiferan. Its symbiotic  sulfur oxidizer bacteria have been characterised as ε-Proteobacteria and γ-Proteobacteria.  Subspecies have been later found associated with cold seeps at Hatsushima in Sagami Bay and at the Daini Tenryu Knoll in the Nankai Trough with specimens obtained at up to  depth.

Lamellibrachia columna from the South Pacific Ocean has been shown to be very closely related genetically.

References

Sabellida
Animals described in 1997
Fauna of the Pacific Ocean